Gniezno is a city in central-western Poland, about  east of Poznań. Its population in 2021 was 66,769, making it the sixth-largest city in the Greater Poland Voivodeship. One of the Piast dynasty's chief cities, it was the first historical capital of Poland in the 10th century and early 11th century, and it was mentioned in 10th-century sources, possibly including the Dagome Iudex, as the capital of Piast Poland. Gniezno is the seat of the Roman Catholic Archdiocese of Gniezno, the country's oldest archdiocese, founded in 1000, and its archbishop is the primate of Poland, making the city the country's ecclesiastical capital. The city is the administrative seat of Gniezno County (powiat).

Geography
Gniezno is one of the historic centers of the Greater Poland region, the cradle of the Polish state. Five lakes are located within the city limits: Winiary, Jelonek, Świętokrzyskie, Koszyk, Zacisze.

History

There are archaeological traces of human settlement since the late Paleolithic. Early Slavonic settlements on Lech Hill and Maiden Hill are dated to the 8th century. At the beginning of the 10th century this was the site of several places sacred to the Slavic religion. The ducal stronghold was founded just before 940 on Lech Hill, and surrounded by some fortified suburbs and open settlements.

Legend of Lech, Czech and Rus

According to the Polish version of a legend, three brothers went hunting together but each of them followed a different prey and eventually they all traveled in different directions. Rus went to the east, Čech headed to the west to settle on the Říp Mountain rising up from the Bohemian hilly countryside, while Lech traveled north. There, while hunting, he followed his arrow and suddenly found himself face-to-face with a fierce, white eagle guarding its nest from intruders. Seeing the eagle against the red of the setting sun, Lech took this as a good omen and decided to settle there. He named his settlement Gniezno (from Polish gniazdo – 'nest') in commemoration and adopted the White Eagle as his coat-of-arms. The white eagle remains a symbol of Poland to this day, and the colors of the eagle and the setting sun are depicted in Poland's coat of arms, as well as its flag, with a white stripe on top for the eagle, and a red stripe on the bottom for the sunset. According to Wielkopolska Chronicle (13th century), Slavs are descendants of Pan, a Pannonian prince. He had three sons – Lech (the youngest), Rus, and Čech (the oldest), who decided to settle west, north, and east.

Cradle of the Polish state
Around 940 Gniezno, being an important pagan cult center, became one of the main fortresses of the early Piast rulers, along with aforementioned fortresses at Giecz, Kruszwica, Poznań, Kalisz, Łęczyca, Ostrów Lednicki, Płock, Włocławek, and others. Archeological excavations on Lech Hill in 2010 discovered an 11th-century tomb by the foundations of St. George's church, near the remains of a pagan burial mound discovered earlier on the hill. Discoveries indicate that Lech Hill could have been the burial place of rulers even before the baptism of Mieszko I of Poland. After the adoption of Christianity by Mieszko I, his son Bolesław I the Brave deposited the remains of Saint Adalbert in a church, newly built on the Hill, to underline Gniezno's importance as the religious centre and capital of his kingdom.

Congress of Gniezno
It is here that the Congress of Gniezno took place in the year 1000, during which Bolesław I the Brave, Duke of Poland, received Holy Roman Emperor Otto III. The emperor and the Polish duke celebrated the foundation of the Polish ecclesiastical province (archbishopric) in Gniezno, along with newly established bishoprics in Kołobrzeg for Pomerania; Wrocław for Silesia; Kraków for Lesser Poland in addition to the bishopric in Poznań for western Greater Poland, which was established in 968.

Royal coronation site
The 10th-century Gniezno Cathedral witnessed the royal coronations of Bolesław I in 1024 and his son Mieszko II Lambert in 1025. The cities of Gniezno and nearby Poznań were captured, plundered and destroyed in 1038 by the Bohemian duke Bretislav I, which pushed the next Polish rulers to move the Polish capital to Kraków. The archepiscopal cathedral was reconstructed by the next ruler, Bolesław II the Generous, who was crowned king here in 1076.

In the next centuries Gniezno evolved as a regional seat of the eastern part of Greater Poland, and in 1238 municipal autonomy was granted by the duke Władysław Odonic. Gniezno was again the coronation site in 1295 and 1300.

Regional site of Greater Poland
 
After an administrative reform Gniezno, as a royal city, became a county seat within the Kalisz Voivodeship (since the early 14th century till 1768). It was destroyed again by the Teutonic Knights' invasion in 1331. The city was soon rebuilt during the reign of King Casimir III the Great, while during the reign of King Władysław II Jagiełło, in 1419, the status of "the capital of Christianity in Poland" was confirmed after the archbishops of Gniezno were given the title of Primate of Poland. Trade flourished in Gniezno, four large annual fairs took place, in which merchants from various Polish cities and European countries took part. Crafts also developed, and Gniezno remained one of the major cities of Poland until the mid-17th century, even despite fires of 1515 and 1613. It was devastated during the Swedish invasion wars of the 17th–18th centuries and by a plague in 1708–1710. All this caused depopulation and economic decline, but the city was soon revived during the 18th century to become the capital of the Gniezno Voivodeship within the larger Greater Poland Province in 1768. Gniezno remained one of the main cultural centeres of the Polish Kingdom.

Late modern period

Gniezno was annexed by the Kingdom of Prussia in the 1793 Second Partition of Poland and renamed Gnesen, becoming part of the province of South Prussia. During the Kościuszko Uprising, the Polish army under General Jan Henryk Dąbrowski liberated the town on 22 August 1794 and defeated a Prussian Army north of Gnesen near Labischin (Łabiszyn) on 29 September 1794. But because of Kościuszko's defeat at the Battle of Maciejowice he gave up his plan to winter in Bromberg (Bydgoszcz) and moved through Thorn (Toruń) and retreated to central Poland. Thus, the Prussians retook it on 7 December 1794. During the Napoleonic Wars there was an uprising against Prussian rule. The French appeared in Gnesen in November 1806, and following General Jan Henryk Dabrowski's order issued to all towns and cities and country property owners to provide recruits for the organizing Polish forces, Gnesen initially provided 60 recruits who participated in the battles of 1806–07. Consequently, the town, once again as Gniezno, was included within the Duchy of Warsaw, but upon the defeat of Napoleon in Russia in 1812 it was occupied by the Russian army and was returned to Prussia in the 1815 Congress of Vienna. Gnesen was subsequently governed within Kreis Gnesen of the Grand Duchy of Posen and the later Province of Posen. It was an important center of Polish resistance against Germanisation policies, various Polish organizations and publishing houses were located there.

Following the Greater Poland Uprising (1918–1919) and the Treaty of Versailles the town became part of the Second Polish Republic and reverted to its original name of Gniezno. 31 Polish insurgents from the city died in the Greater Poland Uprising. Its citizen-soldiers joined the Polish army fighting the Bolsheviks during the Polish–Soviet War.

World War II

During the invasion of Poland, which started World War II, Gniezno was captured by Germans troops on 11 September 1939. On 26 October 1939 it was annexed into Nazi Germany as part of Reichsgau Wartheland. During the German occupation, local Poles were subjected to arrests, expulsions and mass executions. The Germans murdered several hundred inhabitants, and more than 10,000 inhabitants of the city and county were expelled to the General Government in the more-eastern part of German-occupied Poland or imprisoned in Nazi concentration camps. A transit camp for Poles expelled from the region was operated in the city. Kidnapped Polish 12-year-old children were enslaved as forced labour in the city's vicinity. In late 1940 at the Dziekanka (Tiegenhof in German) psychiatric institute near Gniezno, 1172 patients were evacuated and then killed. Again in late 1940 hundreds of patients were gassed in gas van by the Lange Commando, a sub-unit of Einsatzkommando 2. Despite this, Gniezno remained a center of Polish resistance, including the Tajna Organizacja Narodowa (Secret National Organization), which was founded in the city itself. Its commander Maksymilian Sikorski was eventually imprisoned in concentration camps.

After the city was seized by the Red Army on January 21, 1945, the Soviets fought the Polish underground and deported its members deep into the Soviet Union. The city itself was not seriously damaged during the war, however, in 1940, the Germans demolished the monument of King Bolesław I the Brave, which was rebuilt after the war. The city was subsequently restored to Poland, although with a Soviet-installed communist regime, which stayed in power until the Fall of Communism in the 1980s.

Post-war period

In August 1980, employees of local factories joined the nationwide anti-communist strikes, which led to the foundation of the Solidarity organization, which played a central role in the end of communist rule in Poland. In 1979 and 1997, Pope John Paul II visited Gniezno. During the second visit, celebrations took place on the millennial anniversary of the death of St. Adalbert with the participation of presidents of seven Central European countries and 280,000 pilgrims from Poland and the world. In 2000, the millennial anniversary of the Congress of Gniezno was celebrated and on this occasion the Sejm was held in Gniezno, the only one held outside of Warsaw in recent decades.

Archbishops of Gniezno

Gniezno's Roman Catholic archbishop is traditionally the Primate of Poland (Prymas Polski). After the partitions of Poland the see was often combined with others, first with Poznań and then with Warsaw. In 1992 Pope John Paul II reorganized the Polish hierarchy and the city once again had a separate bishop. Cardinal Józef Glemp, who had been archbishop of Gniezno and Warsaw and retained Warsaw, was designated to remain Primate until his retirement, but afterward the Archbishop of Gniezno, at present Wojciech Polak, would again be Primate of Poland.

Royal coronations in Gniezno cathedral

 25 December 1024 – Bolesław I the Brave
 25 December 1025 – Mieszko II Lambert and his wife Richensa of Lotharingia
 25 December 1076 – Bolesław the Generous and his wife Wyszesława of Kiev
 26 June 1295 – Przemysł II and his wife Margaret of Brandenburg
 August 1300 – Wenceslaus II of Bohemia

Demographics

Sights

The landmarks of Gniezno include:
 Gothic Gniezno Cathedral, one of the historically most important Polish churches, designated a Historic Monument of Poland; the seat of the Roman Catholic Archdiocese of Gniezno, which is the oldest archdiocese of Poland, founded in 1000. It contains the Gniezno Doors, one of the most important works of Romanesque art in Poland, as well as the coffin of Saint Adalbert of Prague 
 , filled with historic townhouses, buildings and churches:
 Gothic-Baroque Holy Trinity church
 Gothic-Baroque Franciscan church and monastery
 Gothic Saint John the Baptist church
 Gothic Saint Lawrence church
 Baroque Saint George church
 Gothic Saint Michael Archangel church
 Museum of the Polish State Origins (Muzeum Początków Państwa Polskiego)
 Museum of Archdiocese of Gniezno (Muzeum Archidiecezjalne w Gnieźnie)
 Monument of King Bolesław I the Brave

Education
 Collegium Europaeum Gnesnense (part of Adam Mickiewicz University in Poznań)
 The Gniezno School of Humanism and Management - Millennium (Gnieźnieńska Wyższa Szkoła Humanistyczno-Menedżerska Millennium)
 The Primate's Major Seminary (Prymasowskie Wyższe Seminarium Duchowne)
 The State Vocational College in Gniezno (Państwowa Wyższa Szkoła Zawodowa)

Arts and culture

 Aleksander Fredro Theatre (Teatr im. A. Fredry)
 Museum of the Polish State Origins (Muzeum Początków Państwa Polskiego)
 Museum of Archdiocese (Muzeum Archidiecezji Gnieźnieńskiej)

Sports
The city's most popular sports club is motorcycle speedway team Start Gniezno. The annual speedway Bolesław Chrobry Tournament is held in Gniezno. The city's main football club is Mieszko Gniezno.
The E11 European long distance path for hikers passes through Gniezno.

Notable people

 Hermann Senator (1834–1911), German physician
 Jacob Caro (1836–1904), German historian
 Ludwik Ćwikliński (1853–1942), Polish classical philologist
 Felix Waldstein (1862–1943), German liberal politician
 Kurt Jahnke (1882–1945), German-American intelligence agent 
 Günther Pancke (1889–1973), German SS – General
 Heinz Reinefarth (1903–1979), German SS – General
 Alfons Flinik (1926–2003), Polish field hockey player
 Paweł Arndt (born 1954), Polish politician
 Arkadiusz Radomski (born 1977), Polish footballer
 Łukasz Cieślewicz (born 1987), Polish footballer
 Marika Popowicz-Drapała (born 1988), Polish Athlete
 Kacper Gomólski (born 1993), Polish speedway rider

Twin towns – sister cities

Gniezno is twinned with:

 Anagni, Italy
 Esztergom, Hungary
 Falkenberg, Sweden
 Saint-Malo, France
 Speyer, Germany
 Radviliškis, Lithuania
 Uman, Ukraine
 Veendam, Netherlands

Former twin towns:
 Sergiyev Posad, Russia

In March 2022, Gniezno severed its ties with the Russian city of Sergiyev Posad as a response to the 2022 Russian invasion of Ukraine.

See also
 Gniezno Cathedral
 History of Poland
 Adalbert of Prague
 Royal coronations in Gniezno cathedral
 Gniezno Doors
 Archdiocese of Gniezno

References

External links

Gniezno homepage (English and German version also available), The official site of the Gniezno City's Administration, from which much of the above was taken and adapted.
Gniezno Poviat The official site of the Gniezno County, (English, German, Spanish, French, Italian and Russian version also available)

 
Cities and towns in Greater Poland Voivodeship
Gniezno County
Former capitals of Poland
Populated lakeshore places in Poland
Poznań Voivodeship (1921–1939)